Ascension (previously known as Ascension Press) is a publisher of Catholic books and digital media. The company, founded in 1998, is based in West Chester, Pennsylvania.

Authors published by Ascension include Edward Sri, Fr. Mike Schmitz, and Jeff Cavins. Schmitz and Cavins produced Ascension's Bible in a Year podcast, which was iTunes' most popular podcast for 17 consecutive days in early 2021, and for 5 days in early 2022. Ascension is creating a "Catechism in a Year" podcast with the same hosts, slated to release on January 1, 2023.

Ascension's YouTube channel is called Ascension Presents, which was the second largest Catholic YouTube channel as of 2021.

See also 
 Augustine Institute
 Ignatius Press
 Saint Benedict Press
 Word on Fire

References

External links 
 Ascension website

YouTube channels
 Ascension Presents
 Ascension Press
 La Biblia en un Año
 Sundays with Ascension
 The Bible in a Year
 The Catechism in a Year

1998 establishments in Pennsylvania
American companies established in 1998
Book publishing companies based in Pennsylvania
Companies based in Chester County, Pennsylvania
Publishing companies established in 1998
Catholic publishing companies
West Chester, Pennsylvania
Conservative media in the United States